In mathematics, a Bost–Connes system is a quantum statistical dynamical system related to an algebraic number field, whose partition function is related to the Dedekind zeta function of the number field.  introduced Bost–Connes systems by constructing one for the rational numbers.  extended the construction to imaginary quadratic fields.

Such systems have been studied for their connection with Hilbert's Twelfth Problem.  In the case of a Bost–Connes system over Q, the absolute Galois group acts on the ground states of the system.

References

Number theory
Dynamical systems